Ethel Florence Annie Godfrey (1871 Melbourne, Australia – 1956) was one of the first female dentists in Victoria, Australia.

A graduate of Presbyterian Ladies' College, Melbourne, she was one of four female students at Mr. E. Lenthal Oldfield's Dental College and Oral Hospital where she was a student between 1895 and 1898. She passed the Dental Board exam in November 1898 and registered as a dentist on 8 February 1899. Godfrey practiced dentistry at 34 Collins Street in Melbourne alongside her business partner and future sister-in-law Alys Berry. When she married Dr. Samuel Arthur Ewing in 1903, she stopped her dentistry practice and had three children.

References

1871 births
1956 deaths
Women dentists
20th-century Australian women
People from Melbourne
Australian dentists